Wah Kiu Yat Po, or Overseas Chinese Daily News, was a Chinese-language newspaper based in Hong Kong. It was published between 1925 to 1995. It was founded by Shum Wai-yau after the Shum family took control of the company.

History 
The newspaper was published under the name Chinese General Merchants Daily from 1919 to 1923 when the Chinese General Chamber of Commerce and Daily Press co-owned the company. The contract later ended and the Chinese General Chamber of Commerce published the paper on its own. In 1925, it was sold to Shum Wai-yau. It was renamed Wah Kiu Yat Po  started to publish on 5 June 1925.

In December 1941, the Japanese occupation of Hong Kong began. Wah Kiu Yat Po was one of the few newspaper that was allowed to continue to publish. The newspaper used different writing skills to overcome the review by the Japanese military government and secretly convey the anti-Japanese message. On 1 April 1945, Wah Kiu Man Po was founded. The last release of the newspaper was on 1 April 1988.

In 1985, the founder Shum Wai-yau died. His son Shum Choi-sang was unwilling to continue to run the newspaper. Therefore, in December 1991, the newspaper was sold to South China Morning Post. The Post sold it again in January 1994 to Heung Shu-fai, who make it sales better. However, it still closed down for financial reasons on 12 January 1995. Governor Chris Patten said he was very sad and the paper had been famous for having integrity and concerning community values.

References 

Chinese-language newspapers published in Hong Kong
Publications established in 1925
1925 establishments in Hong Kong
Publications disestablished in 1995
1995 disestablishments in Hong Kong